Richard Bellamy (1743?–1813) was an English bass singer. One of the chief bass singers of his day, Bellamy was appointed a gentleman of the Chapel Royal 28 March 1771, and a lay vicar of Westminster Abbey 1 Jan. 1773.

Bellamy married Miss Elizabeth Ludford: their son, the singer Thomas Ludford Bellamy, inherited considerable property from his mother's father, Thomas Ludford (died 1776).

In 1777 Richard Bellamy became a vicar choral of St. Paul's Cathedral, and from 1793 to 1800 he was also almoner and master of the choristers. In 1784 he was one of the principal basses at the Handel commemoration in Westminster Abbey. He gave up all his appointments in 1801, and died on 11 September 1813. Bellamy published a few sonatas, a collection of glees, and a Te Deum with orchestral accompaniment.

References

Attribution 

English male singers
English basses
1743 births
1813 deaths
Gentlemen of the Chapel Royal